Jacques Le Lavasseur was a French sailor who competed in the 1900 Summer Olympics.

He was crew on the British/French boat Ollé, which won the gold medals in both races of the 2-3 ton class with fellow crew member Frédéric Blanchy and helmsman William Exshaw. He also participated in the open class, but did not finish.

Further reading

References

External links

Olympic sailors of France
French male sailors (sport)
Sailors at the 1900 Summer Olympics – 2 to 3 ton
Year of birth missing
Year of death missing
Olympic gold medalists for France
Sailors at the 1900 Summer Olympics – Open class
Place of birth missing
Place of death missing